Madhumasam is a Telugu-language romantic drama film directed by Chandra Siddhartha. The film stars Sumanth, Sneha, and Parvati Melton in the lead roles. It was produced by D. Ramanaidu on Suresh Productions banner. Madhumasam released on 9 February 2007 and was a hit at the box office having a run of over 100 days in a few centres.

Plot
Sanjay (Sumanth) is an extremely practical man who believes in nothing but logic and reasoning. Hamsa Vahini (Sneha) is the exact opposite of him. She is highly emotional and trusting. Hamsa, not knowing Sanjay's true nature, falls for him and wants to marry him. Sanjay accepts the proposal. In a casual chat right before their engagement, Sanjay reveals that he does not love her and that he is just marrying her, as it is the practical thing to do. This hurts Hamsa and she cancels the engagement. As time goes on, Sanjay starts missing Hamsa, to his own surprise. A heartbroken Hamsa, meanwhile, encounters further issues with her own family. She decides that it's in her best interest to become a person devoid of any emotions or bonds. She loses faith in love and relationships. Despite Sanjay's several attempts to change her back to her old self, she vehemently refuses.  
The rest of the story is depicts her acceptance of Sanjay's love.

Cast

 Sumanth as Sanjay
 Sneha as Hamsa Vahini "Hamsa"
 Parvati Melton as Maya
 Chalapati Rao as Sanjay's father
 Kavitha as Sanjay's mother
 Giri Babu as Hamsa's father
 Naresh as Sanjay's uncle
 Surya as Hamsa's brother-in-law
 Sameer as Hamsa's elder brother
 Ahuti Prasad as Sanjays Uncle
 Venu Madhav as Dharmavarapu Subrahmanyam Nephew
 Dharmavarapu Subrahmanyam as Hamsas Boss
 L. B. Sriram as Hostel Watch man
 AVS as Doctor
 Kondavalasa as Maya's House owner
 Siva Reddy as Police Inspector
 Raavi Kondala Rao as Sanjay's Grandfather
 Ravi Babu as Maya's boss
 Venkat as Peter
 Ashmita Karnani as Hamsa's friend
 Rajitha as Nurse (Assistant to AVS)
 Bangalore Padma as Hostel Warden
 Deepanjali
 Gundu Hanumantha Rao as Police constable.
 Uttej as Sanjay's friend
 Suman Shetty

Soundtrack 

Music was composed by Mani Sharma. Music was released by Aditya Music.

Awards
 Balabhadrapatruni Ramani won Nandi Award for Best Story Writer (2007)

References

External links
 

2007 films
2000s Telugu-language films
Films scored by Mani Sharma
Suresh Productions films